False Idle is an American Christian hardcore band from Boise, Idaho. The band started making music in 2010, and their members are lead vocalist and guitarist, Sef Idle, lead guitarist and background vocalist, Tyler Lewis, bassist and background vocalist, Seth Warren, and drummer and background vocalist, Phil Harris. The band has released four extended plays, Hymns of Punk Rock Praise, in 2010, I Refuse, in 2011, California or Bust, in 2013, and a split EP with the band, A Common Goal , Split Decision, in 2014, all with Thumper Punk Records. Their first full-length studio album, Threat, was released in 2013 by Thumper Punk Records.

Background
False Idle is a Christian hardcore band from Boise, Idaho. Their members are lead vocalist and guitarist, Sef Idle, lead guitarist and background vocalist, Tyler Lewis, bassist and background vocalist, Seth Warren, and drummer and background vocalist, Phil Harris.

Music history
The band commenced as a musical entity in 2010 with their release, Hymns Of Punk Rock Praise, an extended play, that was released by Thumper Punk Records on September 14, 2010. Their second extended play, I Refuse, was initially released by Thumper Punk Records, through Indie Vision Music, as a free download in June 2011. Shortly thereafter, False Idle was approached by Veritas Vinyl who then released the EP as a 7" record. They released, a studio album, Threat, on May 14, 2013, with Thumper Punk Records. Their third extended play, California or Bust, released on October 2, 2013 by Thumper Punk Records.  Their fourth extended play, Split Decision, released on December 16, 2014 by Thumper Punk Records.

Members
Current members
 Sef Idle - lead vocals, guitar
 Seth Warren - bass, background vocals
 Phil Harris - drums, background vocals
Past members
 Tyler Lewis - guitar, background vocals (2011-2015) (I Refuse, Threat, California or Bust, Split Decision)
 Matt Lagusis - Drums (2010-2012) (Hymns Of Punk Rock Praise, I Refuse)

Discography
Studio albums
 Threat (May 14, 2013, Thumper Punk)
EPs
 Hymns of Punk Rock Praise (September 14, 2010, Thumper Punk Records)
 I Refuse (June 2011, Thumper Punk Records)
 California or Bust (October 2, 2013, Thumper Punk Records)
 "Split Decision"  Split EP with A Common Goal (Dec 16, 2014, Thumper Punk Records)

References

External links
Official website

Rock music groups from Idaho
2010 establishments in Idaho
Musical groups established in 2010